William Fernie may refer to:
Willie Fernie (golfer) (1855–1924), Scottish golfer
Willie Fernie (footballer) (1928–2011), Scottish footballer
William Fernie, nineteenth-century prospector and namesake of Fernie, British Columbia
William N Fernie, 2003–2007 councillor of Wick West, Highland, Scotland

See also
Bill Ferny, fictional pony, belonged to Frodo Baggins and his companions in The Lord of the Rings